Tuttle Educational State Forest (TESF) is a  North Carolina State Forest near Lenoir, North Carolina.

Nearby state parks
The following state parks and state forests are within  of Tuttle Educational State Forest:
Grandfather Mountain State Park
Lake James State Park
Rendezvous Mountain State Park
South Mountains State Park

References

External links 
 

North Carolina state forests
State forests of the Appalachians
Protected areas of Caldwell County, North Carolina
Education in Caldwell County, North Carolina
Open-air museums in North Carolina